The Harbour Expressway is a four-lane highway with signalized intersections running the Intercity business district of Thunder Bay, Ontario, Canada.

Thunder Bay City Council looked at renaming the road since it doesn not fit the general definition of an expressway but has decided that it would be unnecessary.

Route description 
The entire route of the Harbour Expressway is four lanes and undivided. All intersections are at-grade. Plans to divide the expressway and build interchanges are on hold, and the city of Thunder Bay maintains a right of way for these expansion plans in its official plan. In some places, there is evidence of those plans.

The highway bisects the Intercity area, which is primarily composed of big box retail stores and office parks. The road is one of the busiest in Thunder Bay.

Construction of the project was part of the provincial government's 1977 construction program.
The completed expressway was opened by Transportation Minister James Snow at a ribbon-cutting ceremony on August27, 1979. It cost C$3.5million to construct.

Major intersections

References 

Roads in Thunder Bay